Cronica Walliae  (full title: Cronica Walliae a Rege Cadwalader ad annum 1294) is a manuscript of chronological history by Humphrey Llwyd written in 1559. Llwyd translated versions of a medieval text about Wales' history, Brut y Tywysogion, from Welsh and Medieval Latin into English. He also added historical material from Matthew Paris and Nicholas Trivet, as well as from other well known historians. It is the first history of Wales written in English and contains material about ancient rulers, with some material based on legends. Llwyd's work gives a history description of Wales that was originally written in the early part of the sixteenth century by Sir John Prise of Brecknockshire, Wales.

History 

This manuscript is Llwyd's earliest and largest work. It is his only surviving work, and describes in detail the lives of Welsh nobility from Cadwaladr Fendigaid to Llywelyn ap Gruffudd and covers from the mid 7th century to the 14th century. Llwyd says his main source was 'the Welsh Cronicle' implicating Caradoc of Llancarfan of the 12th century. His work is based on three (possibly four) different versions of the Chronicle of Caradoc that generally became known as Brut y Tywysogion or "The Brut of the Princes"(also known as "The Chronicle of the Princes"). Llwyd relied heavily on material from the writings of Matthew Paris as he is talked about more than any other historian that he used for reference. Lywyd used much historical material from Matthew Paris's Chronica Majora and Historia Anglorum. According to C.P. Lewis, Llwyd's aim was to show the Welsh had their own history and were an ancient people descended from the Trojans (an idea put forth in the works of Geoffrey of Monmouth). He summed up his work as the perfecte discription of the Countrey as his was in olde tyme and as his is at these dayes to give the idea that it was a historical work.

In 1573, David Powel took over the task of preparing Llwyd's manuscript for publication, upon which John Dee had been working before leaving England. Powel expanded Llwyd's work in its scope and detail, with the help of Lord Burghley providing access to some further documents, making his own contributions clear by typographical distinctions. The resulting publication in 1584, The Historie of Cambria, now called Wales, was the first printed history of Wales. The work remained an important source for medieval Welsh history for several centuries thereafter. It is the earliest extant written version of the history. It popularised the legend that Prince Madoc had discovered America in about 1170, a tale used to justify English encroachments on the territory of Spanish America (for example in Richard Hakluyt's Discourse on Western Planting). Dee, in particular, was influenced by Llwyd's claims and advised Queen Elizabeth I to make this new land a British Empire. Llwyd's work was again edited and published by Robert Vaughan of Hengwrt and later again by William Maurice of Cefn-y-braich. These later copies were the basis for the 1697 publication of History of Wales that was augmented and improved by William Wynne the historian. A reprint of Powel's book of Llwyd's work was published in 1811.

For centuries, Llwyd's original work had been known to scholars only from five surviving manuscripts. In 2002, University of Wales Press published a version of the original manuscript with the title Cronica Walliae. It was prepared mainly by Professor Ieuan M. Williams, and established from the surviving manuscripts. The book Cronica Walliae (2002) by the University of Wales was published by their History and Law Committee consisting of several scholars.

Description 
The 2002 commentary book Cronica Walliae by the University of Wales says the full Latin title of Cronica Walliae a Rege Cadwalader ad annum 1294 in English translates approximately as Chronicle of Wales as a sequential chronological history record of events of Wales from Prince Cadwalader to the year 1294. It says there are five known manuscript copies of Llwyd's work, none in his personal handwriting.

MS 1 BL, Cotton Caligula MS Avi
To historians that wrote on Llwyd this was the best known text. It is preceded by a colophon done by Sir Robert Cotton, Cronica Walliae a Rege Cadwalader ad(num) 1294 Humfredo Floid authore with gave the title "Cronica Walliae" that Llwd's text is known by.
MS 2 Bodleian Library, Ashmole MS, 847
This is a copy of MS 1 above that was done by Robert Glover around 1578. The note on the title page says "This booke was given to Mr J. Dee of Mortlake by his cousin Mr Olyver Lloyd of the Welsh Pole 1575." 
MS 3 BL MS 48090 (Yelverton MS 99), ff. 4–105v
This is a handwritten copy of the Bodleian Library MS 2 manuscript.
MS 4 NLW, Llanstephan MS 177
This edition has no title. It has a treatise called "Kyfrinach y Beirdd" and the note "John ap D'd ap R'c toke possetion upon theyrsdaye being the XXjth of Majj the XV yere of the Raying of our queen Elizabeth 1573 in the hande of Ieuan ap Dav' ap Jankyn thys being wyttenessed Gryffythe mechen, John ap Owen, Gryffyth ap holl, Robert ap John Rondell, Thomas Hirllard." The manuscript is complete except for a small part related to Alfred.
MS 5 NLW 23202 B 
This manuscript was purchased from the Thomas Fairfax Collection by the National Library of Wales in 1993. It is preceded by a colophon text later than the manuscript itself. It has an intricate signature with text by Powell the original Autograph. The signature says "Tho. Powell." There are parts missing, deliberately left out by the copyist, that especially relate to events outside Wales. There are also parts left out related to the church and the papacy. Missing too are sections related to Polydore Vergil and other Welsh links. Because of the missing parts it is not relied on for a Llwyd reference source.

Commentary 
The commentary book shows Llwyd starting his chronology of sequential records of Wales with Prince Cadwaladr of the seventh century. The first thing he explains is that he is the last British king to rule Wales, descending from the noble race of Trojans. He explains the devastating plagues that happened during his reign. He explains that the Britons had been ruled by different kings and princes for 1817 years up to Cadwaladr. Llwyd says Cadwaladr went to Rome for 5 years to study different philosophers and that he died in 688 A.D. He then explains in "Yvor the sonne of Alan, Ina de Stirpe regia filius Kenredi sorori regis Cadwaladri" the next sequence of events that while he was in Rome according to the comanndement received by the angell, he left his son Idwal Iwrch, his sister and his people with Alan, Kinge of litle Bryttayn. Llwyd then explains that the son of Idwal Iwrch Rhodri Molwynog became the ruler of the Kingdom of Gwynedd.  He explains in "Rodryke the sonne of Idwall the sonne of Cadwalader" that Rhodri began his reign in the year 720. Also in this section he details the Battle of Pencon and the Battle of Hehil. Llwyd also talks about the Battle of Carno Mountain in 728 – see eighth-century wars. In this section he also talks about the Ecclesiastical History of the English People being finished in 731 that was written by a great clercke that wroote manye woorkes named Bede from Monkwearmouth. He says the priest Bede died in 733 A.D. He then talks about Swæfberht of Essex and Saelred of Essex. He also describes Battle Edge where King Æthelbald of Mercia was defeated by King Cuthred. Llwyd then talks about King Rhodri Molwynog and that he died in 754 and left his son Cynan Dindaethwy to rule afterwards.

Llwyd then goes into the next section "Kynan Tindaethwy sonne to Rodryck" beginning with the year 755. He details the Battle of Cenn Fabrat (near Seefin Mountain, Co. Limerick) where Dyfynwal the sonne of Teudwr was slain – see Cathussach mac Eterscélai. Llwyd records that Æthelbald of Mercia died in the year 757. He explains then that Beornred of Mercia succeed him. He then shows the next important event in 758 when Elfodd, a Welsh bishop both godly and learned induced the standard for determining the date of Easter. Llwyd then details in his historie the events of the year 763. He begins with Offa of Mercia becoming king and Heaberht of Kent made king of West Saxons. He later explains the Battle of Otford that took place in 776. Llwyd then gives specifics for the well known ditch Offa had built. He describes it as a great dyche large and deepe made between Mercia and Powys from sea to sea. In the sixteenth century it was referred to as Clawdh Offa and Offas Diche. The reason he built the ditch was for protection to defend his country frome the incoursions of the Welshemen.

Llwyd then spells out the next important event as being in the year of our Lord 800 when Egbert of Wessex (Egbrutus) was made king and the following year Coenwulf of Mercia (Kenewlf) was made king. He says the next important event of history was when Cadell ap Brochfael, the king of Powys, died in 808 and his son Cyngen ap Cadell became the new king. Llwyd notes the next interesting event was a solar eclipse on Christmas Day in 810 and at the same time there was an unusually large death rate of cattle in Wales. He notes also that this was the year that St David's Cathedral was bernt by the West Saxons. Llwyd then records the death of Owain ap Maredudd (Dyfed). He then shows as the next dramatic event in 812 when Deganwy Castle was struck by lightning and destroyed.

Llwyd records as events under the section "Blethyn ap Kynvyn and Meredith ap Owen" that in 1073 Bleddyn ap Cynfyn was  traytorouselye and cowardely murdered by Rhys ab Owain after he reigned Wales for 13 years. Under the section "Griffith the sonne of Kynan" Llwyd records as historical events how peacefully after the death of Trahaearn ap Caradog in 1081 Gruffudd ap Cynan ruled Northwales and Rhys ap Tewdwr ruled Southwales. He records the history that led up to this time. One of the events he describes is the murder of Walcher in 1080. He describes in detail how the Northumbrians killed him and his 100 men that accompanied him. Later in this section Llwyd records the historical event of 1125 when Cadwallon ap Gruffydd killed his maternal uncles to capture the district Dyffryn Clwyd.

Under the section "Owen Gwyneth sonne to Griffith ap Kynan" Llwyd records as sequential historical events how the sons of Gruffudd ap Cynan divided up the kingdoms of Wales according to custom after his death in 1137 A.D. Llwyd explains here how Owain Gwynedd is the first to be styled Prince of Wales" starting in 1137 and that the name "king" is no longer used in British records when referring to the ruler of Wales.

Llwyd then describes in his recordings that in the year 1146 Cadwallon ap Madog captured his younger brother Einion Clud and turned him over to King Owain Gwynedd, who in turn handed him over to Henry II to be imprisoned at Winchester. He then explains how Madog soon escapes and goes back to Wales. Llwyd reports also in this section the information that in 1160 Madog ap Maredudd died.

Llwyd then chronicles that in 1165 Dafydd ab Owain Gwynedd destroyed Tegeingl, which at the time belonged to King Henry, and he took all the people and their possessions to the Valley of Clwyd. He then describes the 1169 death of Owain Gwynedd after controlling north Wales for 32 years. The next sequence of events he details gives an accounting of the turmoil this caused among his many children over the inheritance. He follows this up in the next section of the events that happened in the 1170s.

In the section "David the sonne of Owen Gwynedh" Llwyd wrote that After the death of Owen his sonnes fill at debade who shulde enherite after him. For the eldest sonne borne in matrimonye Edward or Erwerth Drwyndwn was counted unmeete for his maime upon his face. And Howell who toke upon him all the rulle was a base sonne begoten upon an Irishwoman. Therefore David gathered all the power he coulde, and came against Howell, and fought with him and slewe him, and afterward enjoyed quietly the whole lande of Northwales,  his brother Iewerth or Edwards sonne came to age as shall hereafter appeare. And at this tyme an other of Owen Gwynedhs sonnes, named Madocke, lefte the lande in contention betwixt his bretherne, and prepared certaine shippes, with men [and] munition, and sought adventures by the seas. And sayled west levinge the cost of Irelande [so far] north that he came to a lande unknownen, where he sawe many strange things. And this lande most needes bee some parte of that lande the which the Hispaniardes affirme them selves to be the first finders, sith Hannos tyme. For by reason and order of cosmographie this lande to which Madoc came to, most needs bee somme part of Nova Hispania, or Florida. And so hit was by Britons longe afore discovered before eyther Colonus or Americus lead any Hispaniardes thyther. Peter Roberts noted that according to Dr John Dee "the Tudors had inherited a historic claim to the newfound lands in the west, first through King Arthur and then through Prince Madoc. It was Humphrey Lhuyd who, in his ‘Cronica Walliae’ (c. 1559), first publicised the legend that the Welsh prince Madog ab Owain Gwynedd (fl. 1170) had sailed across the Atlantic and discovered America." A return trip to Wales by Madoc and a second trip with a number of ships are additionally detailed by Llwyd.

Llwyd describes historical events for the year 1170 saying, But to my hystorie, about the same time e.g., the prearranged marriage of Eleanor of England, Queen of Castile, to King Alfonso VIII of Castile; Owain Cyfeiliog's land grant for the founding of the abbey of Strata Marcella; Richard Strongbow's taking of the towns of Dublin and Waterford with the King of Leinster (and promised marriage to his daughter); and Prince Rhys ap Gruffydd's payments to King Henry II of 300 horses and 4,000 cattle and the 7 October 1170 meeting with King Henry. Llwyd then explains the November 1170 conspiracy to kill Archbishop Thomas Becket which happened then right after Christmas of the same year. He names William de Tracy, Richard le Breton, and  Reginald Fitzurse as three of the four knights that did the murder.

Llwyd then gives the chronological historical events going from 1171 and going into 1172. He records the events of King Henry II visiting Laugharne in 1172 on his return from Ireland and made peace with Prince Rhys. He then describes the Laugharne Charter that was made between them at this time. Llwyd then records the traytorousely and cowardly 1174 murder of Iorwerth Drwyndwn. 
He then gives as a summary how Dafydd ab Owain Gwynedd in the same year imprisons his brother Rhodri and puts him in shackles to take away his inherited lands. Llwyd then states as the next sequence of events how in 1175 Howell, son of Iorwerth, takes Owen Penkarn (his maternal uncle) prisoner, pokes out his eyes and castrates him. He references this back to the history records of Matthew Paris. Llwyd then explains that in 1176 William II of Sicily married Joan the daughter of King Henry II.

Llwyd then notes the records that in 1179 King Henry II of England bought the County of La Marche in France for 6000 of silver and put Hubert de Burgh, 1st Earl of Kent in charge of it. Llwyd's manuscript contains a report regarding an alleged 1179 discovery at Glastonbury Abbey at the island of Avalon (a.k.a. Island of Apples) of the burial place of King Arthur and his wife. He describes it as located fifteen feet down in the ground in an elder treetrunk coffin with a cross of lead. It is referenced to Matthew Paris as being recorded about 10 years after the discovery. The inscription on the cross was recorded to be
Hic jacet sepultus inclitus rex Arthurus in insula Avalonia – Powell spelling.
Hic jacet sepultus inclytus Rex Arthurus in insula Avalonia – Williams spelling.
Here lies buried the renowned King Arthur on the island of Avalon – English translation from the Latin. 

Llwyd details the bones found as  mervelouse biggenesse  and the probable cause of Arthur's death (a hard blow to the head). He further describes the queen's hair as being blonde. He records that clues to King Arthur's burial location were found because of a poem of a bard that King Henry II heard at Pembroke Castle.

Llwyd then in a chronological sequence shows the year 1182 as that when Henry duke of Saxony was exiled from Germany and stayed with King Henry II, his father-in-law, in Normandy. In 1184 is born a son, later to be called William of Winchester, Lord of Luneburg. He also lists 1183 as the year Henry the young King died. Llwyd then tells of the murder of Hugh de Lacy, Lord of Meath in 1186 and Prince John is sent over to Ireland to take possession of his lands and returns at Christmas. The year 1186 is also the time Llwyd lists as when Geoffrey II, Duke of Brittany dies, leaving behind a daughter and a wife pregnant with the future Arthur I, Duke of Brittany. He references these 1180s events back to the historian Matthew Paris.

Llwyd then talks about the year 1187 as being the time when Owain Brogyntyn was murdered at Carreg Cennen Castle. This same year Llwyd shows of when Maelgwn ap Rhys for the first time appears in the historical record bringing his power against Tenby and by brute force took the town burning it down. He then shows the next important time as 1189, being the time when Henry II of England died. He explains then his son Richard becomes King of England. This same year Llwyd explains as being when Rhys ap Gruffydd captured the castles of St. Clear's, Laugharne, and Llansteffan. He further explains that this is when Lord Rhys' son Maelgwn is taken prisoner.
Llwyd goes on to say this is when Richard I of England was officially made Bishop of Durham and Duke of Normandy. Llwyd then points out that Richard was captured in 1192 near Vienna by Leopold V, Duke of Austria, who turns him over to Henry the Emperor that asked for a 20,000 mark ransom.

Llwyd then writes about what historian Nicholas Trivet recorded for the year 1270. He talks about Llywelyn ap Gruffudd and Gruffudd ap Madog (1236–70) Lord of Bromfield. He then ends his manuscript in 1295 with the history of Madog ap Llywelyn and the Battle of Maes Moydog. He claims then that there was nothing worthy done in Wales after this that otherwise could not "bee redde in the Englishe Cronicle".

See also 
Cambriae Typus
Chronica Majora
Brut y Tywysogion

References 
Notes

Citations

Sources

External links 
The historie of Cambria, now called Wales: a part of the most famous yland of Brytaine, written in the Brytish language aboue two hundreth yeares past: tr. into English by H. Lhoyd... Corrected, augmented, and continued out of records and best approoued authors, by Dauid Powel ... Cvm Prjuilegio (1584)

Medieval Welsh literature
Welsh chronicles
16th-century history books
17th-century history books
19th-century history books